Jørgen Jensen (6 January 1947 – 4 March 2015) was a Danish cyclist. He competed in the men's tandem at the 1968 Summer Olympics. For several years he was the chairman of Odense Ishockey Klub. He died in 2015.

References

1947 births
2015 deaths
Danish male cyclists
Olympic cyclists of Denmark
Cyclists at the 1968 Summer Olympics
Sportspeople from Odense